The 1978 Houston Oilers season was the franchise's 19th overall and the ninth in the National Football League (NFL). Led by Rookie RB Earl Campbell, who won both the Offensive Rookie of the Year, and Offensive Player of the Year, who rushed for 1,450 yards, the Oilers made the playoffs with a 10-6 record, qualifying in the newly created 5th Wild Card spot. The franchise scored 283 points while the defense gave up 298 points. Their record of 10 wins and 6 losses resulted in a second-place finish in the AFC Central Division. In the playoffs, the Oilers would stun the Miami Dolphins, 17-9, in the two teams first playoff meeting, then defeated the New England Patriots 31-14 in New England to advance to their first ever AFC Championship game, but in that game, they would score a mere 5 points in a 34-5 blowout loss to the eventual champion Steelers.

Season summary
The Oilers appeared twice on Monday Night Football. In their first appearance on Monday Night Football, the Oilers beat the Pittsburgh Steelers 24–17. In their second appearance, the Oilers defeated the Miami Dolphins 35–30. The Oilers number one draft pick, Earl Campbell, a 5–11, 232-pound ball-carrying dynamo from the University of Texas, joined the Houston Oilers as the first player taken in the 1978 National Football League Draft. The first player to earn All-Southwest Conference honors four years, Campbell was a consensus All-America and the Heisman Trophy winner in 1977. Campbell took the NFL by storm right from the very start. In 1978, he was named the NFL's Most Valuable Player, All-Pro, and Rookie of the Year. He won the league rushing championship with 1,450 yards and was named to the AFC Pro Bowl squad. Possibly the highlight of the Oilers' fantastic season was the contest against the Miami Dolphins, in which Campbell racked up 199 yards, 81 of them coming on a TD run in the fourth quarter.

Offseason

NFL draft

Personnel

Roster

Pre season

Schedule

Pre season Game summaries

Week P1 (Saturday, August 5, 1978): vs. Denver Broncos

Week P2 (Monday, August 14, 1978): vs. Philadelphia Eagles

Week P3 (Saturday, August 19, 1978): at Dallas Cowboys

 Time of Game:

Week P4 (Saturday, August 26, 1978): vs. New Orleans Saints

Regular season
On November 20, 1978, the Oilers took on the Miami Dolphins on Monday Night Football.  In order to boost team spirit, the Oilers gave each fan a blue and white pom-pon before the game.  The sight of over 70,000 fans waving the pom-pons inspired the Oilers to a 35–30 victory, behind Campbell's 199 rushing yards and 4 touchdowns.  This would be the start of Luv Ya Blue.

Schedule

Standings

Regular Season Game summaries

Week 1 (Sunday, September 3, 1978): at Atlanta Falcons

Point spread: 
 Over/Under: 
 Time of Game:

Week 2 (Sunday, September 10, 1978): at Kansas City Chiefs

Week 3 (Sunday, September 17, 1978): vs. San Francisco 49ers

Point spread: 
 Over/Under: 
 Time of Game: 

In an early test to see how good the Oilers are the Oilers took a 10-6 halftime lead on Earl Campbell's 4-yard touchdown run and a Toni Fritsch's 38-yard field goal while the 49ers countered with kicks of 26 and 19 yards by Ray Wersching. The Oilers extend their lead late in the third quarter with a nearly perfect 13-yard touchdown pass from Dan Pastorini to Ken Burrough, who out-reached cornerback Anthony Leonard in the end zone. But Steve DeBerg who had 321 yards passing this day came back with a 58-yard touchdown pass to Freddie Solomon before the third period and then with 7:51 left in the game completed a 78-yard drive that ended with an 8-yard touchdown pass to Paul Seal. It took a determined 80-yard drive that ended with a clutch 19-yard field goal by Fritsch with 1:16 left to give the Oilers the lead, but the 49ers had one more chance and doing it without O.J. Simpson but Wersching's 46-yard field goal sailed wide left as the Oilers got an important win.

Week 4 (Sunday, September 24, 1978): vs. Los Angeles Rams

Point spread: 
 Over/Under: 
 Time of Game:

Week 5 (Sunday, October 1, 1978): at Cleveland Browns

Week 6 (Sunday, October 8, 1978): at Oakland Raiders

Week 7 (Sunday, October 15, 1978): vs. Buffalo Bills

Week 8 (Monday, October 23, 1978): at Pittsburgh Steelers

Point spread: 
 Over/Under: 
 Time of Game:

Week 9 (Sunday, October 29, 1978): at Cincinnati Bengals

Week 10 (Sunday, November 5, 1978): vs. Cleveland Browns

Week 11 (Sunday, November 12, 1978): at New England Patriots

Week 12 (Monday, November 20, 1978): vs. Miami Dolphins

Point spread: 
 Over/Under: 
 Time of Game:

Week 13 (Sunday, November 26, 1978): vs. Cincinnati Bengals

Week 14 (Sunday, December 3, 1978): vs. Pittsburgh Steelers

Point spread: 
 Over/Under: 
 Time of Game:

Week 15 (Sunday, December 10, 1978): at New Orleans Saints

Point spread: 
 Over/Under: 
 Time of Game:

Week 16 (Sunday, December 17, 1978): vs. San Diego Chargers

Postseason

Playoffs

AFC Wild Card

Quarterback Dan Pastorini led the Oilers to an upset victory by passing for 306 yards. Houston outgained the Dolphins in total yards, 455-209, and forced 5 turnovers while only losing one on their end.

Pastorini calling a play during the 1978 AFC Wild Card game

Miami managed to keep Houston running back Earl Campbell well contained in the first half, limiting him to just 16 yards on 13 carries, but they were unable to handle the passing attack of Pastorini, who completed 16 of 21 passes for 261 yards during that time. Meanwhile, Dolphins quarterback Bob Griese completed just 6 of 16 passes in the first two quarters.

The Dolphins scored first after Earnie Rhone recovered a fumbled punt from Robert Woods at the Houston 21-yard line, setting up quarterback Bob Griese's 13-yard touchdown pass to tight end Andre Tillman. However, the Oilers responded with an 11-play, 71-yard drive in which Pastorini completed 6 of 7 passes for 66 yards, the last one a 13-yard touchdown pass to running back Tim Wilson. Neither team scored again until the fourth quarter, despite several chances. In the second quarter, Pastorini completed a 55-yard pass to tight end Mike Barber on the Dolphins 9-yard line, but the drive ended with no points when Toni Fritsch's 28-yard field goal attempt was blocked by linebacker Kim Bokamper. The Oilers later drove to the Dolphins red zone with 14 seconds left in the half. On the next play, Pastorini completed a pass to Ken Burrough, but he was tackled short of the end zone and the clock ran out before the team could spike the ball to stop it.

In the third quarter, Miami blew a chance to take then lead when Garo Yepremian drove a 38-yard field goal attempt wide left. In the final period, Toni Fritsch made a 35-yard field goal to give the Oilers a 10-7 lead. Then linebacker Gregg Bingham intercepted a pass from Griese and returned it 4 yards to midfield. Campbell finally managed to get into gear with a 20-yard run on the ensuing drive, and eventually finished it off with a 1-yard rushing touchdown. The Dolphins closed out the scoring, but only when Pastorini ran out of the end zone for an intentional safety to run out the clock.

Despite his poor first half, Campbell finished the game with 84 rushing yards and a 13-yard reception. Wilson rushed for 76 yards and caught 5 passes for 40. Barber had 112 yards on 4 receptions, while Burroughs caught 6 passes for 103. Griese finished the game just 11/28 for 114 yards, with a touchdown and two interceptions.

This was the first postseason meeting between the Oilers and Dolphins.

AFC Divisional Playoff

Quarterback Dan Pastorini led the Oilers to a victory by throwing for 200 yards and three touchdowns, while running back Earl Campbell rushed for 118 yards and a score.

After a scoreless first quarter, Houston completely took over the game. Houston receiver Ken Burrough caught a pass from Pastorini at the Pats 40-yard, broke through coverage from Mike Haynes, and took off for a 71-yard touchdown reception.  Raymond Clayborn's 47-yard kickoff return gave the Patriots a chance to strike back, but two plays later, Steve Grogan's pass on a flea flicker play was intercepted by Mike Reinfeldt on the Oilers 1-yard line. Aided by an unnecessary roughness penalty that gave them a first down after failing to convert a 3rd down on their own 7-yard line, Houston drove 99 yards to score on Pastorini's 19-yard touchdown pass to tight end Mike Barber. Again, the Patriots seemed ready to respond, driving to the Oilers 23-yard line, but again they came up short due to Reinfeldt, who intercepted another pass from Grogan to end the drive. Reinfeldt's 27-yard return and another unnecessary roughness penalty against New England gave the Oilers a first down on the Patriots 49-yard line. Pastorini completed a 22-yard pass to Barder, and eventually got his team a 21-0 lead with a 13-yard touchdown pass to Barber at the end of the possession.

Pastorini finished the first half with 10 of 12 completions for 184 yards and 3 touchdowns. He threw only two passes in the second half, both completions. Meanwhile, Grogan was benched with 18 seconds left in the half, having completed only 3 of 12 passes for 38 yards.

A 30-yard field goal by Toni Fritsch gave the Oilers a 24-0 third quarter lead before New England managed a comeback. First they drove 75 yards to score on Andy Johnson's 24-yard halfback option play pass to receiver Harold Jackson. Then in the fourth quarter, they took advantage of a short field due to a poor punt by Cliff Parsley, scoring on Tom Owen's 24-yard touchdown pass to tight end Russ Francis that cut their deficit to 24-14. However, their efforts were dashed on their drive when linebacker Gregg Bingham intercepted an Owen pass and returned it 19 yards to the Patriot 18-yard line, setting up Campbell's 2-yard touchdown run to put the game away.

Francis caught 8 passes for 101 yards and a touchdown.

This was the Patriots only playoff loss at Foxboro Stadium. They did not lose another home playoff game again until 31 years later, seven years after Gillette Stadium opened.

This was the first postseason meeting between the Oilers and Patriots.

AFC Championship Game (Sunday, January 7, 1979): at (A1) Pittsburgh Steelers

Point spread: 
 Over/Under: 
 Time of Game: 

On a wet, slick, and slippery field, the Steelers dominated the Oilers by forcing 9 turnovers and only allowing 5 points. Pittsburgh took the early lead by driving 57 yards to score on running back Franco Harris' 7-yard touchdown run. Then, linebacker Jack Ham recovered a fumble at the Houston 17-yard line, which led to running back Rocky Bleier's 15-yard rushing touchdown.

In the second quarter, a 19-yard field goal by Oilers kicker Toni Fritsch cut the score 14–3, but then the Steelers scored 17 points during the last 48 seconds of the second quarter. First, Houston running back Ronnie Coleman lost a fumble, and moments later Pittsburgh wide receiver Lynn Swann caught a 29-yard touchdown reception. Then Johnnie Dirden fumbled the ensuing kickoff, which led to Steelers wide receiver John Stallworth's 17-yard reception. After the Oilers got the ball back, Coleman fumbled again, and Roy Gerela kicked a field goal to increase Pittsburgh's lead, 31–3. Houston never posed a threat for the rest of the game as they turned over the ball four times in their six second-half possessions.

This was the first postseason meeting between the Oilers and Steelers.

Awards and records
 Earl Campbell, NFL Rushing Leader, (1,450)
 Earl Campbell, All-Pro selection
 Earl Campbell, NFL Offensive Rookie of the Year
 Earl Campbell, PFWA NFL MVP
 Earl Campbell, NEA NFL MVP
 Earl Campbell, NFL Offensive Player of the Year
 Earl Campbell, UPI AFL-AFC Player of the Year
 Earl Campbell, Pro Bowl selection 1978

Milestones
 Earl Campbell, 1st 1,000 yard rushing season
 Earl Campbell, 1st NFL rushing title

References

External links
 1978 Houston Oilers at Pro-Football-Reference.com

Houston Oilers
Houston Oilers seasons
Houston